John Linnell (16 June 179220 January 1882) was an English engraver, and portrait and landscape painter. He was a naturalist and a rival to the artist John Constable. He had a taste for Northern European art of the Renaissance, particularly Albrecht Dürer. He also associated with the amateur artist Edward Thomas Daniell, and with William Blake, to whom he introduced the painter and writer Samuel Palmer and others of the Ancients.

Life and work

John Linnell was born in Bloomsbury, London on 16 June 1792., where his father was a carver and gilder. He was in contact with artists from an early age, and by the age of ten was drawing and selling portraits in chalk and pencil. His first art teacher was the American-born artist Benjamin West, and he spent a year in the house of the painter John Varley, where William Hunt and William Mulready were also pupils, and made the acquaintance of Shelley, Godwin and others. In 1805 he was admitted to study at the Royal Academy, where he obtained medals for drawing, modelling and sculpture. He was trained as an engraver, and executed a transcript of Varley's "Burial of Saul."

In 1808, the 16-year-old Linnell moved into Mulready's house, whose wife had accused him of infidelity with both other women and boys. Linnell's association with Mulready may have caused the breakup of Mulready's marriage.

In later life Linnell occupied himself with the burin, publishing, in 1833, a series of outlines from Michelangelo's frescoes in the Sistine Chapel, and, in 1840, superintending the issue of a selection of plates from the pictures in Buckingham Palace, one of them, a Titian landscape, which he engraved in mezzotint. At first he supported himself mainly by miniature painting and execution of larger portraits, such as the likenesses of Mulready, Richard Whately, Peel and Thomas Carlyle. Several of his portraits he engraved in line and mezzotint.

He painted many subjects like the "St John Preaching," the "Covenant of Abraham," and the "Journey to Emmaus," in which, while the landscape is usually prominent the figures are of sufficient importance to supply the title of the work. But it is mainly in connexion with paintings of pure landscapes that his name is known. His works commonly deal with some scene of typical uneventful English landscape, which is made impressive by a gorgeous effect of sunrise or sunset. They are full of true poetic feeling, and are rich and glowing in colour.

Linnell commanded large prices for his pictures, and about 1850 he purchased a property at Redhill, Surrey, where he lived till his death on 20 January 1882, painting with unabated powers until within the last few years of his life. He devoted himself to painting landscapes notably of the North Downs and Kentish Weald. His leisure was occupied with a study of the Bible in the original, and he published several pamphlets and treatises of Biblical criticism. Linnell was one of the best friends and kindest patrons of William Blake. He gave him the two largest commissions he received for single series of designs—£150 for drawings and engravings of The Inventions to the Book of Job, and a like sum for those illustrative of Dante Aligheri.

He was a friend of the painter Edward Thomas Daniell. A blue plaque commemorates Linnell at Old Wyldes' at North End, Hampstead. The plaque mentions that William Blake stayed with Linnell as his guest.

Gallery

Legacy
Linnell has over 150 oil paintings in public ownership in the United Kingdom.

References

Sources

Further reading

External links

 
 Linnell online (ArtCyclopedia)
 The John Linnell Archive at the Fitzwilliam Museum, Cambridge

1792 births
1882 deaths
19th-century English painters
English male painters
English landscape painters
English watercolourists
English portrait painters
People from Bloomsbury
Painters from London
19th-century English male artists